Garmok may refer to:

 Garmak, Jajrom, a village in North Khorasan Province, Iran
 Garmak, Maneh and Samalqan, a village in North Khorasan Province, Iran